(born 7 February 1965) is an author, translator, and the present (19th generation) head of the main Tokugawa clan. His great-great-grandfather was the famed Matsudaira Katamori of Aizu, and his maternal great-great-grandfather was Tokugawa Iesato, the sixteenth head of the Tokugawa clan.

Life
Tokugawa graduated from Keio University before completing a doctorate of economics at the University of Michigan. He is fluent in English, and translated from Japanese a book written by his father, Tsunenari Tokugawa titled Edo no idenshi (江戸の遺伝子) or The Edo Inheritance. He has translated books by Tony Blair, George Soros, George Friedman, Amy Chua, Frances McCall Rosenbluth and Rajiv Chandrasekaran's book 'Green Zone' into the Japanese language. He has also worked for the United Nations Food and Agriculture Organization.

In 2019, Tokugawa attempted to win a seat on the House of Councillors for the Shizuoka District, which he lost. He ran as a member of the Constitutional Democratic Party of Japan, and campaigned on completely decommissioning the Hamaoka Nuclear Power Plant, which was shut down following the Fukushima nuclear disaster in 2011.

Ancestry

Patrilineal descent

Tokugawa's patriline is the line from which he is descended father to son.

The existence of a verifiable link between the Nitta clan and the Tokugawa/Matsudaira clan remains somewhat in dispute.

Descent prior to Keitai is unclear to modern historians, but traditionally traced back patrilineally to Emperor Jimmu
Emperor Keitai, ca. 450–534
Emperor Kinmei, 509–571
Emperor Bidatsu, 538–585
Prince Oshisaka, ca. 556–???
Emperor Jomei, 593–641
Emperor Tenji, 626–671
Prince Shiki, ????–716
Emperor Kōnin, 709–786
Emperor Kanmu, 737–806
Emperor Saga, 786–842
Emperor Ninmyō, 810–850
Emperor Montoku 826-858
Emperor Seiwa, 850-881
Prince Sadazumi, 873-916
Minamoto no Tsunemoto, 894-961
Minamoto no Mitsunaka, 912-997
Minamoto no Yorinobu, 968-1048
Minamoto no Yoriyoshi, 988-1075
Minamoto no Yoshiie, 1039-1106
Minamoto no Yoshikuni, 1091-1155
Minamoto no Yoshishige, 1114-1202
Nitta Yoshikane, 1139-1206
Nitta Yoshifusa, 1162-1195
Nitta Masayoshi, 1187-1257
Nitta Masauji, 1208-1271
Nitta Motouji, 1253-1324
Nitta Tomouji, 1274-1318
Nitta Yoshisada, 1301-1338
Nitta Yoshimune, 1331?-1368
Tokugawa Chikasue?, ????-???? (speculated)
Tokugawa Arichika, ????-????
Matsudaira Chikauji, d. 1393?
Matsudaira Yasuchika, ????-14??
Matsudaira Nobumitsu, c. 1404-1488/89?
Matsudaira Chikatada, 1430s-1501
Masudaira Nagachika, 1473-1544
Matsudaira Nobutada, 1490-1531
Matsudaira Kiyoyasu, 1511-1536
Matsudaira Hirotada, 1526-1549
Tokugawa Ieyasu, 1st Tokugawa Shōgun (1543-1616)
Tokugawa Yorifusa, 1st Lord of Mito (1603-1661)
Matsudaira Yorishige, 1st Lord of Takamatsu (1622-1695)
Matsudaira Yoriyuki (1661-1687)
Matsudaira Yoritoyo, 3rd Lord of Takamatsu (1680-1735)
Tokugawa Munetaka, 4th Lord of Mito (1705-1730)
Tokugawa Munemoto, 5th Lord of Mito (1728-1766)
Tokugawa Harumori, 6th Lord of Mito (1751-1805) 
Matsudaira Yoshinari, 9th Lord of Takasu (1776-1832) 
Matsudaira Yoshitatsu, 10th Lord of Takasu (1800-1862) 
Matsudaira Katamori, 9th Lord of Aizu (1836-1893) 
Tsuneo Matsudaira (1877-1949) 
Ichirō Matsudaira (1907-1992) 
Tsunenari Tokugawa (born 1940)
Iehiro Tokugawa (born 1965)

See also 

 Tokugawa clan
 Matsudaira clan (parent house of Tokugawa clan)
 Nitta clan (parent house of Tokugawa clan)
 Minamoto clan (parent house of Matsudaira and Nitta clans)
 Imperial House of Japan (parent house of Minamoto clan)

References

1965 births
Living people
Tokugawa clan
Columbia University alumni
University of Michigan alumni
Keio University alumni
Japanese businesspeople